Gilberto García (born 24 January 1969) is a Dominican Republic judoka. He competed at the 1988 Summer Olympics and the 1992 Summer Olympics.

References

1969 births
Living people
Dominican Republic male judoka
Olympic judoka of the Dominican Republic
Judoka at the 1988 Summer Olympics
Judoka at the 1992 Summer Olympics
Place of birth missing (living people)